Baz Howz-e Sofla (also Romanized as Bāz Ḩowz̤-e Soflá; also known as Bāz Ḩowz-e Pā’īn, Bāzeh Ḩowz-e Pā’īn, Bāzeh Ḩowz-e Soflá, and Bāz Ḩowz) is a village in Meyami Rural District, Razaviyeh District, Mashhad County, Razavi Khorasan Province, Iran. At the 2006 census, its population was 332, in 83 families.

References 

Populated places in Mashhad County